The 2023 Mountain West Conference women's basketball tournament will be held between March 5–8, 2023, at the Thomas & Mack Center on the campus of University of Nevada, Las Vegas, in Las Vegas, Nevada.

Seeds
Teams are seeded by conference record, with a ties broken by record between the tied teams followed by record against the regular-season champion, if necessary.

Schedule

Bracket

* denotes overtime period

See also
 2023 Mountain West Conference men's basketball tournament

References

Mountain West Conference women's basketball tournament
2022–23 Mountain West Conference women's basketball season
Basketball competitions in the Las Vegas Valley
College basketball tournaments in Nevada
Mountain West Conference women's basketball tournament
Mountain West Conference women's basketball tournament
Women's sports in Nevada
College sports tournaments in Nevada